Vokesimurex mindanaoensis, common name the Mindanao murex, is a species of sea snail, a marine gastropod mollusk in the family Muricidae, the murex snails or rock snails.

Description
The size of the shell varies between 59 mm and 114 mm.

Distribution
This marine species occurs off the Philippines and Indonesia.

References

 Houart R. (2014). Living Muricidae of the world. Muricinae. Murex, Promurex, Haustellum, Bolinus, Vokesimurex and Siratus. Harxheim: ConchBooks. 197 pp.

External links
 

Gastropods described in 1841
Vokesimurex